The 2013 FIRA-AER Women's Sevens – Division A was the second level of international women's rugby sevens competitions organised by FIRA-AER for 2013. The competition featured just one tournament, played in Prague. Sweden won the tournament and, along with runner-ups Belgium, were promoted to the 2014 Grand Prix series.

Pool stages

Group A

Romania 0-14 Poland
Croatia 12-5 Georgia
Sweden 29-0 Austria
Georgia 7-15 Poland
Romania 12-0 Austria
Sweden 10-0 Croatia
Austria 5-36 Poland
Sweden 0-19 Georgia
Croatia 28-7 Romania
Georgia 31-0 Austria
Croatia 5-14 Poland
Sweden 26-0 Romania
Croatia 34-0 Austria
Romania 55-0 Georgia
Sweden 19-0 Poland

Group B

Belgium 33-5 Denmark
Moldova 45-0 Hungary
Switzerland 5-29 Czech Republic
Hungary 14-24 Denmark
Belgium 24-12 Czech Republic
Switzerland 7-19 Moldova
Czech Republic 35-7 Denmark
Switzerland 21-5 Hungary
Moldova 0-28 Belgium
Hungary 0-33 Czech Republic
Moldova 26-5 Denmark
Switzerland 7-40 Belgium
Moldova 7-7 Czech Republic
Belgium 41-0 Hungary
Switzerland 24-7 Denmark

Knockout stage

Bowl
Semi-finals
Georgia 31-0 Hungary
Austria 7-22 Denmark
11th Place
Hungary 0-27 Austria
Final
Georgia 28-0 Denmark

Plate
Semi-finals
Croatia 5-10 Switzerland
Romania 12-17 Moldova
7th Place
Croatia 5-19 Romania
Final
Switzerland 5-15 Moldova

Cup
Semi-finals
Sweden 14-10 Czech Republic
Poland 0-36 Belgium
3rd Place
Czech Republic 15-0 Poland
Final
Sweden 0-24 Belgium

Sources: unknown 

A
2013
Europe
2013 in Czech sport